Mponela is a town in Dowa District in the Central Region of Malawi.

Mponela lies at 1,200 m in the Dowa District in the Central Region of Malawi, 60 km north of Lilongwe, with a population of 24,543 (2018 Census). It is on the tarred road between Lilongwe–Mzuzu, is connected with power and phone lines and has an airstrip.

Mponela is primarily an agricultural town without touristic interest. The government maintains a nutrition centre in which 700 children per day obtain food.

Demographics

References

Populated places in Central Region, Malawi